Buckhorn Township is one of thirteen townships in Harnett County, North Carolina, United States. The township had a population of 1,905 according to the 2000 census. It is a part of the Dunn Micropolitan Area, which is also a part of the greater Raleigh–Durham–Cary Combined Statistical Area (CSA) as defined by the United States Census Bureau.

Geographically, Buckhorn Township occupies  in northwestern Harnett County.  There are no incorporated municipalities located in Buckhorn Township, however, there are several unincorporated communities located here, including the communities of Cokesbury and Duncan.  The township's northern border is with Wake County.

Parkers Creek rises and joins the Cape Fear River within this township.

See also 
 Buckhorn Township (Wake County)

References

Townships in Harnett County, North Carolina
Townships in North Carolina